Dicepolia venezolalis is a moth in the family Crambidae. It was described by James E. Hayden in 2009. It is found in Amazonas in Venezuela and in French Guiana.

The length of the forewings is 6.3–6.9 mm. The forewings are greyish yellow-brown, with mixed dark brown scales. The costa and transverse lines are dark brown. The hindwings are semi-translucent off-white with a pale brownish terminal area. Adults have been recorded on the wing in November in Venezuela and December in French Guiana.

Etymology
The species name refers to the known distribution.

References

Moths described in 2009
Odontiinae